Boulal is a village and seat of the commune of Dabo in the Cercle of Nara in the Koulikoro Region of south-western Mali.

References

Populated places in Koulikoro Region